Jorge Edward Grant (born 19 December 1994) is an English professional footballer who plays as a midfielder for Scottish Premiership side Heart of Midlothian.

Club career

Nottingham Forest
After spending time at the Nike Academy, Grant moved to Nottingham Forest's academy, where he played for two years before joining the first-team squad. Grant made his professional debut on 12 August 2014 as an 87th-minute substitute in a 1–0 win over Tranmere Rovers. On 25 September, Grant started Forest's third and final League Cup game of the 2014–15 season away at Spurs, and scored his first goal in professional football with a close-range finish in the 61st minute. Forest ultimately lost this game 3–1.

Notts County (loan)
On 31 January 2017 Grant joined Forest's city rivals Notts County on loan for the remainder of the season, having featured for the Reds in an Under-23 match against the Notts' counterparts earlier that day. After completing the signing, Magpies manager Kevin Nolan described Grant as a player with "brilliant technical ability (who) will add creativity and flair". In Grant's second game for the club he scored a 93rd-minute equaliser in a 2–2 draw at home to Exeter City. After a successful spell at County, in which he starred with six goals in seventeen games to help the club avoid relegation from League Two, Grant signed a three-year deal with Forest on 12 June to extend his stay until 2020. After signing the deal, Grant told iFollow Forest that he was targeting a starting position in Forest's first-team ahead of the new season.

Grant re-signed on loan with Notts County on 20 July 2017, joining the club for the 2017–18 season.

Luton Town (loan)
On 6 July 2018, it was announced that Grant would join Luton Town on loan for their 2018–19 season. The loan was terminated early on 7 January 2019 after making 22 appearances and scoring four goals for Luton.

Mansfield Town (loan)
On 14 January 2019, Grant joined Mansfield Town on loan until the end of the season.

Lincoln City
On 5 July 2019, Grant signed for Lincoln City for an undisclosed fee. He signed a new two and a half year contract on 29 January 2021, keeping him at the club until the summer of 2023. His form was not unnoticed as he made the League One Team of the Season for the 2020-21 season. In June 2021, it was revealed that the contract which he signed in January had a buyout clause to any Championship side and that a deal for his sale was 'imminent' according to Lincoln CEO, Liam Scully.

Peterborough United
On 29 June 2021, Grant completed a move to Championship side Peterborough United for an undisclosed fee, signing a three-year deal.

On 18 September 2021, Grant scored his first goal for Peterborough United in a 3-0 win over Birmingham City.

Heart of Midlothian
On 27 June 2022, Grant joined Heart of Midlothian for an undisclosed fee, signing a three-year deal.

Career statistics

Honours
Luton Town
EFL League One: 2018–19

Individual
PFA Team of the Year: 2017–18 League Two
PFA Team of the Year: 2020–21 League One
EFL League Two Team of the Season: 2020–21

References

External links

1994 births
Living people
Sportspeople from Banbury
English footballers
Association football midfielders
Nottingham Forest F.C. players
Notts County F.C. players
Luton Town F.C. players
Mansfield Town F.C. players
Lincoln City F.C. players
English Football League players
Nike Academy players
Peterborough United F.C. players
Heart of Midlothian F.C. players
Scottish Professional Football League players